This is a list of seasons completed by the Chicago Blackhawks professional ice hockey club of the National Hockey League. This list documents the records and playoff results for all seasons the team has completed since their inception in 1926.

Table key

Year by year

1 From 1927–1936 Quarterfinals and Semifinals series were played with a two-game total goals format.
2 Season was shortened due to the 1994–95 NHL lockout.
3 Season was cancelled due to the 2004–05 NHL lockout.
4 As of the 2005–06 NHL season, all games will have a winner; the OTL column includes SOL (Shootout losses).
5 Season was shortened due to the 2012–13 NHL lockout.
6 The 2019–20 NHL season was suspended on March 12, 2020 due to the COVID-19 pandemic.
7 Season was shortened due to the COVID-19 pandemic.

All-time records

References

Chicago Blackhawks season statistics and records @ hockeydb.com

 
sea
National Hockey League team seasons
Chicago Blackhawks